The Life Line is a 1919 American silent drama film directed by Maurice Tourneur and starring Jack Holt, Wallace Beery and Lew Cody. The picture was based on the play The Romany Rye by the British playwright George R. Sims. The film is set amongst the criminal classes in the slums of London.

Cast
 Jack Holt as Jack Hearne, the Romany Rye
 Wallace Beery as Bos
 Lew Cody as Phillip Royston
 Tully Marshall as Joe Heckett
 Seena Owen as Laura
 Pauline Starke as Ruth Heckett

Preservation status
A print is preserved at Filmmuseum Amsterdam aka the EYE Institut.

References

Bibliography
 Waldman, Harry. Maurice Tourneur: The Life and Films. McFarland, 2008.

External links

1919 films
1919 drama films
Silent American drama films
1910s English-language films
Films directed by Maurice Tourneur
American silent feature films
Films set in London
Films set in England
American films based on plays
American black-and-white films
1910s American films